Chris Geile (born April 14, 1964) is a retired United States professional American football Offensive Lineman who played 1 season in the National Football League with the Detroit Lions in 1987. He played college football for Eastern Illinois University.

References

1964 births
Living people
American football offensive linemen
Eastern Illinois Panthers football players
Detroit Lions players
People from Pleasanton, California